Andromeda VIII (And VIII / 8) is a galaxy discovered in August 2003. It is a companion galaxy to the Andromeda Galaxy, M31, and evaded detection for so long due to its diffuse nature.  The galaxy was finally discovered by measuring the redshifts of stars in front of Andromeda, which proved to have different velocities than M31 and hence were part of a different galaxy.

As of at least 2006, the actuality of And VIII as a galaxy has not yet been firmly established (Merrett et al. 2006).

See also
 List of Andromeda's satellite galaxies

References

External links
SEDS Webpage for Andromeda VIII

Andromeda Subgroup
Local Group
Andromeda (constellation)
Dwarf spheroidal galaxies
5056928
Astronomical objects discovered in 2003